This is a list of players who have played at least one game for the Minnesota North Stars of the National Hockey League (NHL). This list does not include players for the Dallas Stars 1993 to present day or any merged from the Oakland Seals 1967 to 1970 , California (Golden) Seals 1970 to 1976 and Cleveland Barons 1976 to 1978.


Key
  Hockey Hall of Famer

Skaters

Goaltenders

See also
List of NHL players

References
hockeydb.com

Minnesota North Stars
players